Larry Tanimoto is an American administrator and politician. Tanimoto became the Mayor of Hawaii County in 1990 following the death of Mayor Bernard Akana.

Tanimoto became the managing director of Mayor Bernard Akana's administration following the departure of Akana's previous director, Susan Labrenz. Mayor Akana died of stomach cancer on April 12, 1990, at the age of 70. Tanimoto became the interim Mayor of Hawaii upon Akana's passing. He held the mayoral office for eight months until a special election could be held to fill the remainder of Akana's unexpired term.

Democrat Lorraine Inouye won the special election to succeed Akana and Tanimoto in 1990. He defeated fellow Democrat Stephen K. Yamashiro by just 76 votes in the special election.

References

Year of birth missing
Mayors of Hawaii County
Hawaii Republicans
People from Hawaii (island)
Hawaii politicians of Japanese descent
American mayors of Japanese descent
American politicians of Japanese descent
Asian conservatism in the United States